Vietnam competed at the 1992 Summer Olympics in Barcelona, Spain.
The delegation included twelve members (seven athletes, three coaches, and two officials) in three events: athletics, swimming, and shooting.

Competitors
The following is the list of number of competitors in the Games.

Results by event

Athletics
Men's Marathon
 Lưu Văn Hùng → 85th place (2:56.42)
Women's Marathon
 Đặng Thị Tèo → Did not finish

Swimming
Women's 100m Breaststroke
 Nguyễn Thị Phương
 Heat – DSQ (→ did not advance, no ranking)

Women's 200m Breaststroke
 Nguyễn Thị Phương
 Heat – 2:57.71 (→ did not advance, 38th place)

Women's 100m Butterfly
 Nguyễn Kiều Oanh
 Heat – 1:05.19 (→ did not advance, 42nd place)

Women's 200m Individual Medley
 Nguyễn Kiều Oanh
 Heat – 2:35.71 (→ did not advance, 41st place)

References

Official Olympic Reports

Nations at the 1992 Summer Olympics
1992
1992 in Vietnamese sport